Brigadier Javed Ashraf Bajwa is a retired Pakistan Army engineer officer. Brigadier Javed Ashraf Bajwa was Commander of Frontier Works Organisation (FWO). Bajwa was awarded with Sitara-i-Imtiaz (Civil) in 2007. Brigadier Javed Ashraf Bajwa was commander of Pakistan Engineers Battalion in East Timor in 2002.

As a civil engineer by profession, Bajwa has been associated with Pakistan's war-front and affected areas where he also led Pakistan Army Corps of Engineers to reconstruct and rehabilitate the towns and cities.

Since his retirement, he has been associated with the reconstruction of Sukkur Barrage, where he has closely work with Pakistan Army Corps of Engineers and the civil contractors. Currently he is working in the construction of a new phase in Defence Housing Authority Islamabad.

See also
Bajwa

References

External links
 Bajwa

Pakistan Army officers
Recipients of Sitara-i-Imtiaz
Pakistani military engineers
Living people
Pakistani civil engineers
Year of birth missing (living people)